Paul Crotty may refer to: 
 Paul A. Crotty (born 1941), American judge
 Michael Paul Crotty (born 1941), retired senior Royal Air Force Commander and Aerospace director